Dolichyl-P-Man:Man5GlcNAc2-PP-dolichol alpha-1,3-mannosyltransferase (Man5GlcNAc2-PP-Dol mannosyltransferase, ALG3, dolichyl-P-Man:Man(5)GlcNAc(2)-PP-dolichyl mannosyltransferase, Not56-like protein, Alg3 alpha-1,3-mannosyl transferase, Dol-P-Man:Man5GlcNAc2-PP-Dol alpha-1,3-mannosyltransferase) is an enzyme with systematic name dolichyl beta-D-mannosyl phosphate:D-Man-alpha-(1->2)-D-Man-alpha-(1->2)-D-Man-alpha-(1->3)-(D-Man-alpha-(1->6))-D-Man-beta-(1->4)-D-GlcNAc-beta-(1->4)-D-GlcNAc-diphosphodolichol alpha-1,3-mannosyltransferase. This enzyme catalyses the following chemical reaction

 dolichyl beta-D-mannosyl phosphate + D-Man-alpha-(1->2)-D-Man-alpha-(1->2)-D-Man-alpha-(1->3)-[D-Man-alpha-(1->6)]-D-Man-beta-(1->4)-D-GlcNAc-beta-(1->4)-D-GlcNAc-diphosphodolichol  D-Man-alpha-(1->2)-D-Man-alpha-(1->2)-D-Man-alpha-(1->3)-[D-Man-alpha-(1->3)-D-Man-alpha-(1->6)]-D-Man-beta-(1->4)-D-GlcNAc-beta-(1->4)-D-GlcNAc-diphosphodolichol + dolichyl phosphate

The formation of N-glycosidic linkages of glycoproteins involves the ordered assembly of the common Glc3Man9GlcNAc2 core-oligosaccharide on the lipid carrier dolichyl diphosphate.

References

External links 
 

EC 2.4.1